Bönig or Bonig is a German language surname and a variant of Böhning. Notable people with the name include:
 Isabel Bonig (1970), Spanish politician
 Philipp Bönig (1980), German former professional footballer
 Sebastian Bönig (1981), German football coach and former player
 Winfried Bönig (1959), German organist

References 

German-language surnames
German patronymic surnames